Luckyn is a surname. Notable people with the surname include:

William Luckyn (disambiguation)
Capel Luckyn (1622–1680), English politician
Luckyn Baronets